Donald Roy Johnson (November 12, 1926 – February 10, 2015) was a Major League Baseball pitcher. The ,  right-hander was signed by the New York Yankees before the 1944 season, and he played for the Yankees (1947, 1950), St. Louis Browns (1950–51), Washington Senators (1951–52), Chicago White Sox (1954), Baltimore Orioles (1955), and San Francisco Giants (1958).

Johnson made his major league debut on April 20, 1947, starting game 2 of a doubleheader against the Philadelphia Athletics at Shibe Park. He was the winning pitcher in the 10-inning, 3–2 Yankee victory, and went on to have a 4–3 record for the 1947 World Series Champions.

Johnson pitched both as a starter and in relief during his long, well-traveled career. His best season statistically was in 1954 with the White Sox. He won 8, lost 7, had a 3.12 earned run average, and finished in the American League Top ten in games pitched, saves, and shutouts.

Career totals include a record of 27–38 in 198 games, 70 games started, 17 complete games, 5 shutouts, 62 games finished, 12 saves, and an ERA of 4.78. He had a rather high WHIP of 1.580 in 631 innings pitched.

Johnson led the International League with 156 strikeouts and a 2.67 ERA while playing for the Toronto Maple Leafs in 1953. He was voted the IL's most valuable pitcher in 1957.

References 

1955 Baseball Register published by The Sporting News

External links

Retrosheet
Obituary

1926 births
2015 deaths
Baltimore Orioles players
Baseball players from Portland, Oregon
Chicago White Sox players
Kansas City Blues (baseball) players
Major League Baseball pitchers
Newark Bears (IL) players
New York Yankees players
Portland Beavers players
Sacramento Solons players
St. Louis Browns players
San Francisco Giants players
Toronto Maple Leafs (International League) players
Washington Senators (1901–1960) players